Charlie Goh (born 14 September 1988) is a Singaporean actor and singer. Goh has become a local celebrity after the successes of Ah Boys to Men movie series by director Jack Neo.

Filmography

Film

Television series

References

External links
 
 

1988 births
Living people
21st-century Singaporean male actors
21st-century Singaporean male singers